Shamil Zukrulakhovich Kurbanov (born 10 April 1993) is an Azerbaijani-Russian football player.

Club career
He made his debut in the Russian Football National League for FC Baltika Kaliningrad on 18 March 2013 in a game against FC Petrotrest Saint Petersburg.

References

External links
 
 
 Career summary by sportbox.ru
 

1993 births
People from Orekhovo-Zuyevsky District
Living people
Russian sportspeople of Azerbaijani descent
Citizens of Azerbaijan through descent
Russian footballers
Azerbaijani footballers
Azerbaijan youth international footballers
Association football midfielders
Association football defenders
FC Baltika Kaliningrad players
FC Saturn Ramenskoye players
FC Dynamo Stavropol players
FC Sibir Novosibirsk players
FC Volga Nizhny Novgorod players
FC Sever Murmansk players
FC Znamya Truda Orekhovo-Zuyevo players
Sportspeople from Moscow Oblast